The name variable chachalaca may refer to one of two bird species:
 Little chachalaca, Ortalis motmot
 Chestnut-headed chachalaca, Ortalis ruficeps